The (first) cruzeiro  (Cr$) was the official currency of Brazil from 1942 to 1967.  It replaced the old real (pl. réis), which had been in use since colonial times, at the rate of Rs 1$000 = Cr$1,  It was in turn replaced by the cruzeiro novo, at the rate of Cr$1,000 = NCr$1.

The name cruzeiro was later reused for two other currencies, which were official in 1970–1986 (initially denominated as the cruzeiro novo to avoid confusion between new and old currency) and 1990–1993.

The cruzeiro was divided into 100 centavos, a convention that persisted through all subsequent Brazilian currencies, but in the first cruzeiro, values below Cr$0.10 were never issued because Rs 10 coins (equivalent to Cr$0.01) had not circulated since the end of the 19th century, and Rs 20 and Rs 50 coins (equivalent to Cr$0.02 and Cr$0.05 respectively) had not been issued since 1935.

Initially, the project, dating from the late 1920s, was that the amount to be converted into a cruzeiro would be Rs 10$000 (ten mil-réis) and that the new currency was linked to the gold standard, but this project was aborted and the cruzeiro was put into circulation at par with the value of Rs 1$000 (one mil-réis) without linked to the gold standard, which changed the situation by making coins below 10 centavos not exist in this monetary standard.

History 
Since colonial times, the main currency in Brazil had been the real; first the same as the Portuguese currency, and a separate currency after the country's independence in 1822.

On 1 November 1942 the real was replaced by a new currency, the "cruzeiro", officially worth Rs 1$000 (mil réis, pronounced mirréis) — which had long been used informally as the currency unit for most retail trades. The old réis banknotes and coins remained in use for a while.  Some were overstamped with the amount in cruzeiros.  New cruzeiro banknotes were printed starting in 1943.

By 1967 devaluation (inflation) of the cruzeiro had rendered prices unwieldy, so on 13 February 1967 the military government decreed its replacement by a new currency, the cruzeiro novo (NCr$), at a rate of NCr$1 = Cr$1,000.

Name
The name refers to the constellation of the Southern Cross, known in Brazil as Cruzeiro do Sul, or simply Cruzeiro. Prominently visible in the southern hemisphere, it is a major cultural icon in Brazilian history. It is used in a number of Brazilian states' flags, was part of companies' logotypes (like former Sudameris bank or flight company Cruzeiro do Sul) and also gave the name of Cruzeiro Esporte Clube, one of the main Brazilian soccer teams.

The name  cruzeiro for the brazilian currency was proposed in 1926, by Brazilian economist Carlos Inglês de Sousa (1882–1948). The first editorial of the Brazilian weekly magazine Cruzeiro apparently refers to this proposal as an alleged inspiration for its name.

Initially, the plan, in the late 1920s, was to implement the Cruzeiro with the equivalent of Rs 10$000 (ten mil-réis), the currency being linked to the gold standard. However, due to the crash of 1929, the subsequent revolution of 1930 and the abandonment of the gold standard by the world in 1933, this project was abandoned, with the redenomination only taking place in 1942, with Cruzeiro having the equivalent of the circulating mil-réis.

Symbol
The cruzeiro broke with Portuguese and Brazilian traditions for the writing of currency amounts. Instead of using the double-stroke dollar sign (cifrão) as a thousands separator (as was the practice with reais) or as the decimal fraction separator (as Portugal adopted when it switched to the escudo and centavos), the cruzeiro  followed its traditional notation for numbers in general, with period (".") and comma (",") used for those two functions, respectively.

The dollar sign was retained, but as part of the new currency symbol "Cr $" (two separate letters and a single-stroke dollar sign, with a space before the latter, to be written before the number, "whatever its amount".  However, in subsequent years the two-stroke variant of the sign was often used too, and the space was usually omitted. Also, some typewriters and typefaces provided a typographic ligature "₢" (available in Unicode) to replace the "Cr" (thus producing "₢$").

Coins 
Six denominations of coin were introduced in 1942: Cr$0.10, Cr$0.20 and Cr$0.50, and Cr$1, Cr$2 and Cr$5. The centavos were initially struck in cupronickel, switching to aluminium bronze in 1943, whilst the cruzeiros were struck in aluminium bronze from the start. The Cr$5 was not struck after 1943.

Following the end of the Vargas Era, in 1947 and 1948 replacements for the Cr$0.10, Cr$0.20 and Cr$0.50 coins were issued that did not portray Getúlio Vargas on the obverse. The new designs featured busts of proeminent Brazilian people, along with the new president, Dutra.

A few more designs were later introduced in 1956 and 1957, which eventually made aluminium replace aluminium bronze in all the coins.

Coinage stopped production in 1961. In 1964, Law 4511 established the end of the cent and the issuance of coins of Cr$1, Cr$2, Cr$5, Cr$10, Cr$20, Cr$50, Cr$100, Cr$200 and Cr$500, with only coins in the denomination of Cr$10, Cr$20 and Cr$50 came to be launched in 1965. Such coins would lose their value after a year of the establishment of the new Cruzeiro.

Banknotes 
The first banknotes were overprints on earlier mil réis notes, with denominations of Cr$5, Cr$10, Cr$20, Cr$50, Cr$100, Cr$200 and Cr$500.  Regular issues of cruzeiro banknotes began in 1943 with the addition of  Cr$1,000 notes. Cr$1 and Cr$2 notes were introduced in 1944 and ceased production after 1958.

With the exception of the Cr$1 banknote, produced only by the American Bank Note Company, the other banknotes of this pattern were issued in second stamp by Thomas de la Rue, bear the words "2º estampa" with variations in the color of the obverse of the banknote, being the Cr$5 banknotes issued until 1964 and the others issued until the entry into circulation of the cruzeiro novo.

The first banknotes of the standard were autographed, a custom that continued until the early 1950s, when signatures began to appear on microseals. The "Nota do Índio" and banknotes issued up to the end of the 1950s bear the words "No Tesouro Nacional se pagará ao portador a quantia de" with the value in full followed by the term "Valor recebido" at the end. Banknotes issued issued in 1960s by the American Bank Note Company and Thomas de la Rue in amounts from Cr$5 to Cr$5,000 appear only with the terms "República dos Estados Unidos do Brasil", "Tesouro Nacional" and "Valor Legal" having the other aforementioned sayings suppressed.

In 1961, the third stamp of the Cr$5 banknote, called "Nota do Índio", would be released experimentally by the Casa da Moeda do Brasil. The very limited print run of this banknote issued in the years 1961 and 1962, as well as its low intrinsic value, made this banknote a true souvenir quite collected by numismatists.

In 1962, Law 4190 established that Cruzeiro banknotes would have the words "República dos Estados Unidos do Brasil", "Tesouro Nacional" and "Valor Legal" on the obverse of the banknotes and established the issuing of the Cr$5,000 banknote, which was put into circulation in 1963. In December 1964, law 4511 established the end of the centavos, the creation of Cr$1, Cr$2, Cr$5, Cr$10, Cr$20, Cr$50, Cr$100, Cr$200 and Cr$500 coins, as well as the issuing of the Cr$10,000 note, which would become the only banknote of the standard to be issued by the Central Bank of Brazil having the title "Banco Central" instead of the title "Tesouro Nacional" present in the other banknotes issued in this monetary standard.

The last banknotes of this standard had an equivalence stamp affixed from 1967 onwards with the corresponding value of the banknote in Cruzeiros Novos, being used provisionally in the transition between the banknotes produced abroad to new centavo coins that began to be minted from 1967 and the banknotes that would be produced mainly by Casa da Moeda do Brasil from 1970.

See also

 Peso
 Dollar
 Portuguese escudo

References 

cruzeiro (1942-1967)
20th century in Brazil
1940s in Brazil
1950s in Brazil
1960s in Brazil
Currencies introduced in 1942